Nifantovskaya is a rural locality (a village) in Oshevenskoye Rural Settlement of Kargopolsky District, Arkhangelsk Oblast, Russia. The population was 12 as of 2010.

Geography 
Nifantovskaya is located 34 km north of Kargopol (the district's administrative centre) by road. Pogost Navolochny is the nearest rural locality.

References 

Rural localities in Kargopolsky District